Mostafa Kamal Tolba (8 December 1922 – 28 March 2016) was an Egyptian scientist who served for seventeen years as the executive director of the United Nations Environment Programme (UNEP).

Biography 

Mustafa Kamal Tolba was born in the town of Zifta (located in Gharbia Governorate), Tolba graduated from Cairo University in 1943 and obtained a PhD from Imperial College London five years later. He established his own school in microbiology at Cairo University's Faculty of Science and also taught at the University of Baghdad during the 1950s. In addition to his academic career Tolba worked in the Egyptian civil service.

After serving briefly as President of the Egyptian Olympic Committee (1971–1972), Tolba led Egypt's delegation to the landmark 1972 Stockholm Conference, which established the United Nations Environment Programme. Tolba became UNEP's Deputy Executive Director immediately after the conference, and two years later was promoted to executive director. During his long tenure (1975–1992), he played a central role in the fight against ozone depletion, which culminated with the Vienna Convention (1985) and the Montreal Protocol (1987). He also was a significant influence in the creation and organization of the Intergovernmental Panel on Climate Change.

In 1982, Mostafa K. Tolba, as executive director of the United Nations environmental program, told UN delegates that if the nations of the world continued their present policies, they would face by the turn of the century ''an environmental catastrophe which will witness devastation as complete, as irreversible, as any nuclear holocaust.''

Tolba died on 28 March 2016 in Geneva at the age of 93.

Publications
Tolba's publications include more than 95 papers on plant pathology, as well as over 600 statements and articles on the environment.

References

External links
Image of Mostafa Tolba

1922 births
2016 deaths
Alumni of Imperial College London
Cairo University alumni
Academic staff of Cairo University
Egyptian biologists
Egyptian civil servants
Environmental scientists
Egyptian microbiologists
United Nations Environment Programme
Egyptian officials of the United Nations
Foreign Members of the Russian Academy of Sciences
Egyptian expatriates in the United Kingdom